Lester Barrie (born October 1, 1965) is a Southern California Christian pastor, a professional stand-up comedian, and former movie and television actor.

Reverend Barrie is currently the assistant at the Atherton Baptist Church in Hawthorne California, where he has served since February 2022. Additionally, Barrie makes stand-up comedy appearances at clubs, colleges, and churches around the country.

Biography

He hails from Chicago, Illinois. His family moved to Southern California in 1980. He attended Cerritos College before transferring to the University of Southern California.

In 2006 Lester Barrie Founded Perfecting Christian Fellowship Church in the City of Carson, California, and after moving around for many years, the ministry merged its membership and ministry efforts with the Bible Believers MBC in 2011.

Additionally, Lester Barrie has enjoyed much success as a stand-up comedian over the years. In 1993 he won best comedian on Star Search over a young Dave Chappelle. In 1999 he would host a season of Comic View on Black Entertainment Television.

His latest television appearance as a stand-up comedian would be a set on Martin Lawrence's First Amendment Stand Up on the STARZ Network in 2009. To date Lester Barrie still makes frequent appearances at the Laugh Factory in Hollywood and Long Beach, California.

Lester Barrie also enjoyed moderate success in small acting roles as well, most notably guest-starred on several episodes of Fox's & Sci-Fi Networks Sliders and best known for a guest role in the Wayans brothers film Don't Be a Menace to South Central While Drinking Your Juice in the Hood as the Preacher.

Lester has a son born in 1995 from a previous marriage and is remarried since 2013 with a daughter born in 2016.

References

External links
 https://web.archive.org/web/20141218032544/http://perfectingchristianfellowship.com/

American stand-up comedians
Living people
University of Southern California alumni
People from Los Angeles
People from Chicago
Baptist ministers from the United States
Comedians from California
Comedians from Illinois
1964 births